Jovan Gligorijević (ca. 1785–1813), known as Zeka Buljubaša (Зека Буљубаша), was a Serbian revolutionary captain (buljubaša) and nobleman active during the First Serbian Uprising.

Early life
Gligorijević was born in ca. 1785, in Sjenica. His family hailed from Nevesinje. He was brought up working for Serb and Turkish merchants, from where he learnt to ride horses, use weapons, and the Turkish language. He went to school in a monastery. His parents called him zeka (rabbit) due to his green eyes.

Zeka came to the Sanjak of Smederevo due to the outbreak of the First Serbian Uprising. Prior to the uprising, he lived in Višegrad. A story goes that he left his home village after falling out with his close friend, a Turk from Nevesinje, after telling him about murdering a Turk man who was about to rape a Serb widow, his neighbour; the friend told Zeka that his Islamic faith could not look over this, and suggested a gun duel; Zeka shot him in the shoulder and immediately left his home for Višegrad. He was not yet 20 years old at that time.

Career

At first, Zeka served in the company of Duke Stojan Čupić in Mačva, then served as border protection by the Drina (towards the Bosnia Eyalet). He was usually posted in Parašnica near Crna Bara.

Zeka formed a company of 50–200 men, called the Goli Sinovi ("Naked Sons", a term for people without wives and children), or Golaći. Although implying poverty, the soldiers were later richly dressed and armed. Zeka and his company also participated in great battles, such as Lešnica and Loznica, but especially successfully watched Turkish movements and intercepted troops. After receiving the rank of buljubaša/captain he became known by the people as "Zeka Buljubaša".

He commanded a company of volunteers, who were sometimes dressed in broadcloth, though armed with the most beautiful weapons. In 1813, he commanded a brigade (800-1000 soldiers) in the last battle of First Serbian Uprising, Battle of Ravanj. When the brigade's ammunition ran out, they rushed the Ottomans with knives and were all killed, near Zasavica.

Legacy
Dušan Baranin wrote two novels on his life, Zeko Buljubaša (1954) and Golaći (1966). A football club in Ravnje bears his name.

In the novel Hajduk Stanko by Janko Veselinović, Zeka Buljubaša is one of the main characters. 

Also, his descendants are Savkić family, named after his brother Savko .

See also
 List of Serbian Revolutionaries

References

Sources
  
  
 

19th-century Serbian people
People of the First Serbian Uprising
Serbian military leaders
Serbian rebels
People from Sjenica
Serbian military personnel killed in action
1780s births
1813 deaths